Number 5 (Army Co-operation) Squadron (although His Majesty the King awarded No. V (Army Cooperation) Squadron) was a squadron of the Royal Air Force. It most recently operated the Raytheon Sentinel R1 Airborne STand-Off Radar (ASTOR) aircraft from RAF Waddington, Lincolnshire, between April 2004 until March 2021.

First formed in July 1913, the squadron served throughout the First World War, holding the distinction of gaining the first loss and kill for the Royal Flying Corps. No. V Squadron relocated to India in 1920 where it remained during the Second World War. During the Cold War, No. 5 (Fighter) Squadron flew the English Electric Lightning and Panavia Tornado F3.

History

Formation to First World War

No. 5 Squadron of the Royal Flying Corps (RFC) was formed at Farnborough, Hampshire, on 26 July 1913, from members of No. 3 Squadron. Following the outbreak of the First World War, No. V Squadron deployed to France on 15 August 1914, equipped with a variety of aircraft types to implement reconnaissance for the British Expeditionary Force (BEF). It flew its first missions on 21 August and on the next day, an Avro 504 of No. 5 Squadron was the first British aircraft to be shot down, its crew of pilot Second Lieutenant Vincent Waterfall and navigator Lieutenant Charles George Gordon Bayly being killed over Belgium. On 24 August, No. V Squadron became the first unit in the RFC to shoot down an enemy aircraft with gunfire when Lt. Wilson and Lt. Rabagliati shot down a German Etrich Taube near Le Cateau-Cambrésis.

From 24 March until 7 April 1917 the squadron was based at La Gorgue in northern France.

No. 5 Squadron standardised on the Royal Aircraft Factory B.E.2, specialising as observers for artillery, re-equipping with the Royal Aircraft Factory R.E.8 in May 1917, and working closely with the Canadian Corps, through to the end of the war and into 1919, when it moved into Germany as part of the Army of Occupation.  (Its association with the Canadian Corps led to the incorporation of a maple leaf in the squadron's badge when it was approved in June 1937).

Interwar years
No. V Squadron returned to the UK in September 1919 before disbanding on 20 January 1920. The squadron was reformed at Quetta, India (now part of Pakistan) on 1 April 1920, when No. 48 Squadron was renumbered. There it continued working in Army Air Cooperation for operations on the North West Frontier. Upon reformation the unit was equipped with the Bristol F.2B which were flown up until 1931. In May 1931, No. 5 Squadron began to convert to the Westland Wapiti Mk.IIa.

Second World War

At the outbreak of war in September 1939, No. 5 Squadron were based at Fort Sandeman, still equipped with the Westland Wapiti biplane. The squadron became a light bomber unit when it converted to the Hawker Hart in June 1940. No. 5 Squadron further converted to the Hawker Audax in February 1941, using it as a fighter. In December 1941, the squadron relocated to RAF Dum Dum, Calcutta, and began to receive their first monoplane – the American-built Curtiss Mohawk Mk.IV. Posted to RAF Dinjan, Assam, in May 1942, No. V Squadron became tasked with escorting Bristol Blenheim bombers over north west Burma.

The Mohawks were replaced by Hawker Hurricane Mk.IIcs and Mk.IIds in June 1943 while the squadron was based at RAF Kharagpur. In September 1944, No. 5 Squadron converted to the Republic Thunderbolt Mk.I and Mk.II. In May 1945, No. V Squadron was withdrawn from the front line in preparation for the liberation of Malaya from Japanese occupation, however this was never carried out due to the Japanese Empire surrendering on 15 August 1945.

Cold War
Remaining in India, No. 5 Squadron converted to Hawker Tempest F.2 in February 1946, but disbanded on 1 August 1947 due to the Partition of India. On 11 February 1949, the squadron reformed at RAF Pembrey in Wales for target-towing duties when No. 595 Squadron was renumbered, however the squadron was shortly disbanded on 25 September 1951. The squadron was reformed at RAF Wunsdorf, West Germany, on 1 March 1952, and were equipped with the de Havilland Vampire F.5. No. V Squadron converted over to the de Havilland Venom FB.1 in December 1952. The 1957 Defence White Paper saw the disbandment of No. 5 Squadron on 12 October 1957 while operating the Venom FB.5.

On 20 January 1959, the squadron was reformed as a night fighter unit at RAF Laarbruch, West Germany, flying the Gloster Meteor NF.11. No. 5 Squadron began converting to the delta winged Gloster Javelin FAW.5 in January 1960. When No. 33 Squadron was disbanded on 17 December 1962, No. V Squadron was allocated the former unit's Javelin FAW.9, along with crew members. No. 5 Squadron itself was disbanded on 7 October 1965 at RAF Geilenkirchen.

Lightning and Tornado (1965–2003)

The squadron reformed as No V (AC) Squadron at RAF Binbrook, Lincolnshire, on 8 October 1965 with the English Electric Lightning interceptor. However, upon reformation the unit did not initially operate a Lightning, with the squadron first flying Hawker Hunter T.7A WV318 fitted with Lightning instruments. No V (AC) Squadron's first Lightning arrived on 19 November, when Lightning T.5 XS451 was delivered to RAF Binbrook. The squadron's first single seat Lightnings arrived on 10 December 1965, when Lightning F.3s XR755 and XR756 were delivered. No. V (AC) Squadron received their first production Lightning F.6 on 3 January 1967, with the arrival of XS894. Between 6 and 25 October 1967, the squadron deployed to RAF Luqa, Malta, with nine Lightning F.6s and a single Lighting T.5 for an Air Defence Exercise (ADEX) against Avro Vulcan B.2s of No. 50 Squadron. No 5 (AC) Squadron deployed to RAF Luqa once again between 1 and 8 August 1968 for Exercise Nimble.

Notably, over Christmas 1969, V(AC) Squadron deployed on reinforcement Exercise Ultimacy to RAF Tengah, Singapore using in flight refuelling and stopping only once en route at RAF Masirah in Oman. Long-distance route proving with the new overwing tanks had taken place previously in 1968 with a limited non stop deployment to RAF Muharraq in Bahrain.

In 1970, the squadron received a pair of Lightning F.1As (XM181 and XM183), which were used as targets for the Lightning F.6s due to them being lighter and more nimble (these were later replaced with Lightning F.3s). On 8 September 1970, the squadron lost Lightning F.6 XS894 when it crashed near Flamborough Head, Yorkshire, killing the pilot USAF Capt. William Schaffner. No. V (F) Squadron deployed two Lighting F.3s, seven Lightning F.6s and a single two-seat T.5 to RAF Luqa between 18 November and 13 December 1974, as part of Exercise Sunfinder alongside Avro Shackleton AEW.2s of No. 8 Squadron and English Electric Canberra B.2s of No. 85 Squadron. Between 5 April and 7 May 1976, the squadron deployed to RAF Luqa with ten Lightning F.6s for an APC. No V (AC) Squadron's last APC deployment to RAF Luqa was between 31 March and 5 May 1977.

In November 1987, No. V (AC) Squadron put up a nine-ship of Lightning F.6s to mark the type's impending withdrawal after 22 years of service. The last Lightnings were withdrawn by December 1987, with the squadron relocating to RAF Coningsby in preparation for the Panavia Tornado F.3. No V (AC) Squadron received their first Tornado F.3 in January 1988.

In August 1990, V (AC) Squadron was the first RAF squadron (accompanied by No. 29 (F) Squadron) to be deployed as part the UK's contribution to the Gulf War, with the first six Tornado F.3s arriving on 11 August at Dhahran Airfield, Saudi Arabia. Between 1993 and 1995, the squadron helped enforce the no-fly zone over Bosnia and Herzegovina as part of Operation Deny Flight. No V (AC) Squadron disbanded on 30 September 2002, with personnel being reassigned to other units.

Sentinel R1 (2004–2021)

The squadron reformed on 1 April 2004 as No. 5 (Army Co-operation) Squadron at RAF Waddington. The first production Raytheon Sentinel R1 made its maiden flight on 26 May 2004. The ASTOR system officially entered service with the No. 5 (AC) Squadron on 1 December 2008. The fifth and last Sentinel to be delivered to the squadron was ZJ694 in February 2009. Full Operating Capability was achieved at the end of 2010. The new radar-equipped aircraft provides battlefield and ground surveillance for the British Army in a similar role to the American Northrop Grumman E-8 Joint STARS aircraft. In 2011, Sentinels from No. V (AC) Squadron participated in operations over Libya as part of Operation Ellamy, which were later described as pivotal by RAF Air Chief Marshal Sir Stephen Dalton.

Between 2009 and 2011, No. V (AC) Squadron also briefly operated four Hawker Beechcraft Shadow R.1, based on the Beechcraft King Air 350. The first Shadow R.1 (ZZ416) was delivered to the squadron in May 2009. These were transferred over to the newly reformed No. 14 Squadron in October 2011.

On 25 January 2013, a Sentinel R1 deployed to Dakar-Ouakam Air Base, Senegal, to assist with France's Operation Serval in Mali. Over the course of a four-month long detachment, Sentinels flew a total of 697 hours across 66 sorties. On 18 May 2014, the squadron deployed a Sentinel to Kotoka International Airport, Ghana, in order to assist with searching for 223 schoolgirls who had been kidnapped by Boko Haram in Nigeria. In September 2014, the squadron temporarily relocated to RAF Cranwell along with No. 14 Squadron due to the resurfacing of RAF Waddington's runway which took over a year to complete. No. 5 (AC) Squadron sent a single Sentinel R.1 to Exercise Red Flag 15–1 at Nellis AFB, Nevada, between 26 January and 13 February 2015. On 26 March 2015, No. 5 (AC) Squadron deployed two Sentinel R1s to RAF Akrotiri, Cyprus, in support of Operation Shader.

In July 2017, Sentinel R.1 ZJ693 was withdrawn from use, with the remaining four Sentinels being given an out of service date (OSD) of 2021. In February 2020, the OSD was confirmed by the Ministry of Defence as March 2021. On 25 February 2021, ZJ694 carried out No. V (AC) Squadron's last Sentinel R.1 operational sortie. Across the Sentinel's 14 years of service, the squadron flew 32,000 hours across 4,870 sorties. The squadron was subsequently disbanded on 31 March 2021.

Aircraft operated
Aircraft operated by No. 5 Squadron include:

* Avro Type E (July 1913–July 1914)
 Farman MF.7 Longhorn (July 1913–July 1914)
 Farman HF.20 (July 1913–July 1914)
 Farman MF.7 Longhorn (July 1913–Mar 1915)
 Royal Aircraft Factory S.E.2a (Jan 1914–Mar 1914)
 Sopwith Three-seater (Feb 1914–Aug 1914)
 Royal Aircraft Factory B.E.1 (1914–Aug 1914)
 Sopwith Tabloid (June 1914–Aug 1914)
 Avro 504 (July 1914–Aug 1915)
 Royal Aircraft Factory B.E.8 (Aug 1914–Sep 1914)
 Farman HF.27 (Sep 1914–Sep 1914)
 Bristol Scout (Sep 1914–Oct 1914; 1915–Mar 1915)
 Martinsyde S.1 (Jan 1915–Aug 1915)
 Voisin LA (Feb 1915–Mar 1915)
 Blériot Parasol (Mar 1915–May 1915)
 Vickers F.B.5 (Mar 1915–Jan 1916)
 Caudron G.3 (Apr 1915–May 1915)
 Airco DH.2 (July 1915–Aug 1915; Jan 1916–May 1916)
 Royal Aircraft Factory B.E.2c (Aug 1915–Apr 1917)
 Royal Aircraft Factory F.E.8 (Dec 1915–May 1916)
 Royal Aircraft Factory B.E.2d (June 1916–June 1917)
 Royal Aircraft Factory B.E.2e (Jan 1917–June 1917)
 Royal Aircraft Factory B.E.2f (Jan 1917–June 1917)
 Royal Aircraft Factory B.E.2g (Jan 1917–June 1917)
 Royal Aircraft Factory R.E.8 (May 1917–Mar 1918)
 Bristol F.2B (Mar 1919–Sep 1919; Apr 1920–May 1931)
 Westland Wapiti Mk.IIa (May 1931–June 1940)
 Hawker Hart (June 1940–Feb 1941)
 Hawker Audax (Feb 1941–Sep 1942)
 Curtiss Mohawk Mk.IV (Dec 1941–June 1943)
 Hawker Hurricane Mk.IIc (June 1943–Sep 1944)
 Hawker Hurricane Mk.IId (June 1943–Sep 1944)
 Republic Thunderbolt Mk.I (Sep 1944–Feb 1946)
 Republic Thunderbolt Mk.II (Sep 1944–Feb 1946)
 Hawker Tempest F.2 (Mar 1946–Aug 1947)
 Supermarine Spitfire LF.16e (Feb 1949–Feb 1951)
 Miles Martinet TT.1 (Feb 1949–Feb 1951)
 Airspeed Oxford T.1 (Feb 1949–Feb 1951)
 Bristol Beaufighter TT.10 (Feb 1949–Feb 1951)
 de Havilland Vampire F.3 (Aug 1950–Sep 1951)
 de Havilland Vampire FB.5 (Mar 1952–Dec 1952)
 de Havilland Venom FB.1 (Dec 1952–July 1955)
 de Havilland Venom FB.4 (July 1955–Oct 1957)
 Gloster Meteor NF.11 (Jan 1959–Aug 1960)
 Gloster Javelin FAW.5 (Jan 1960–Nov 1962)
 Gloster Javelin FAW.9 (Nov 1962–Oct 1965)
 Hawker Hunter T.7A (Oct 1965–196?)
 English Electric Lightning T.5 (Nov 1965–1987)
 English Electric Lightning F.3 (Dec 1965–Jan 1967; Oct 1972–Sep 1987)
 English Electric Lightning F.6 (Dec 1966–Dec 1987)
 English Electric Lightning F.1A (June 1970–Sep 1972)
 Panavia Tornado F3 (Jan 1988–Sep 2002)
 Raytheon Sentinel R1 (2006–March 2021)
 Hawker Beechcraft Shadow R1 (May 2009–Oct 2011)

See also
List of Royal Air Force aircraft squadrons

References

Notes

Bibliography

 Ashworth, Chris. Encyclopedia of Modern Royal Air Force Squadrons. Wellingborough, UK:PSL, 1989. .
 Bartlett, S/Ldr C.P.O., DSC. Bomber Pilot, 1916–18. Shepperton, Surrey, UK: Ian Allan, 1974. .
 Bartlett, S/Ldr C.P.O., DSC. In the Teeth of the Wind (The Story of a Naval Pilot on the Western Front, 1916–1918). London: Leo Cooper, 1994. .
 Halley, James J. The Squadrons of the Royal Air Force & Commonwealth, 1918–1988. Tonbridge, Kent, UK: Air-Britain (Historians) Ltd., 1988. .
 Jackson, A. J. Avro Aircraft since 1908. London:Putnam, Second edition, 1990. .
 Jefford, C.G. RAF Squadrons, a Comprehensive Record of the Movement and Equipment of all RAF Squadrons and their Antecedents since 1912. Shrewsbury: Airlife Publishing, 2001. .
 Lewis, Peter. Squadron Histories: R.F.C, R.N.A.S and R.A.F., 1912–59. London: Putnam, 1959.
 Moxon, Oliver. Bitter Monsoon: The Memoirs of a Fighter Pilot. London: Robert Hale, 1955. (Being the Memoirs of Stephan James, Burma 1944).
 Rawlings, John D.R. Coastal, Support and Special Squadrons of the RAF and their Aircraft. London: Jane's Publishing Company Ltd., 1982. .
 Rawlings, John D.R. Fighter Squadrons of the RAF and their Aircraft. London: Macdonald and Jane's (Publishers) Ltd., 1969 (new edition 1976, reprinted 1978). .
 Strange, L.A. Recollections of an Airman. London: Greenhill Books, 1989. . (Reprint of the original edition of 1933, with new material added).
 Yoxall, John. "No. 5 Squadron: A History of the "Fighting Fifth": Part 1". Flight, Vol. 72, No. 2543, 18 October 1957. pp. 618–623.
 Yoxall, John. "No. 5 Squadron: A History of the "Fighting Fifth": Part 2". Flight, Vol. 72, No. 2544, 25 October 1957. pp. 642–646.
 Yoxall, John. "No. 5 Squadron: A History of the "Fighting Fifth": Part 3". Flight, Vol. 72, No. 2546, 8 November 1957. pp. 745–746.

External links

RAF – 5 Squadron

Military units and formations established in 1913
005 Squadron
005 Squadron
1913 establishments in the United Kingdom
Military units and formations disestablished in 1947
Military units and formations established in 1949
Military units and formations disestablished in 1957
Military units and formations established in 1959
Military units and formations disestablished in 2003
Military units and formations established in 2004